Sıtkı Güvenç (1 November 1961 – 9 February 2023) was a Turkish politician from the Justice and Development Party who was a member of the Grand National Assembly of Turkey from 2011 to 2015. He represented the electorate of Kahramanmaraş. 

Güvenç died after being critically injured during the 2023 Turkey–Syria earthquake, three days after the quake.

Personal life 
His brother Celalettin Güvenç is also an MP from Kahramanmaraş.

References

See also 
 24th Parliament of Turkey

1961 births
2023 deaths
Victims of the 2023 Turkey–Syria earthquakes
Members of the 24th Parliament of Turkey
Justice and Development Party (Turkey) politicians
People from Kahramanmaraş Province
21st-century Turkish politicians